Hampea montebellensis is a species of flowering plant in the family Malvaceae. It is found only in Mexico.

References

montebellensis
Endemic flora of Mexico
Endangered biota of Mexico
Endangered flora of North America
Taxonomy articles created by Polbot